
Richemont may refer to:

Companies

 Compagnie Financière Richemont SA, a Switzerland-based holding company

Places in France

Richemont is the name of some communes in France:

 Richemont, Moselle, in the Moselle département
 Richemont, Seine-Maritime, in the Seine-Maritime département
 Richemont (Charente), former French commune in the Charente, now belong to Cherves-Richemont
 Saint-Crépin-de-Richemont in Dordogne
 Cherves-Richemont in Charente

See also

 Castel of Richemont of Saint-Crépin-de-Richemont
 Château de Richemont of Villette-sur-Ain
 Castel of Richemont (Charente) of Cherves-Richemont
 Richmond (disambiguation)

People

 Arthur de Richemont, French military chief in the Hundred Years' War and duke of Brittany
 Camus de Richemont, French military chief and baron d' Empire
 Eugène Desbassayns de Richemont (1800–1859), French colonial administrator and inventor
 Pierre Desbassyns de Richemont (1833–1912), French archaeologist and politician